Vermilion Bay Airport  is located near Machin, Ontario, Canada.

See also
 Vermilion Bay Water Aerodrome

References

Registered aerodromes in Kenora District